John Chun Sai So  (born 2 October 1946) is a Hong Kong Australian businessman who served as the 102nd Lord Mayor of Melbourne, the capital of Victoria, Australia. He was the first Lord Mayor in the city's history to be directly elected by voters; previously, Lord Mayors were elected by the councillors. He is also the first Lord Mayor of Melbourne of Chinese descent.

First elected in 2001 and re-elected in 2004, So is the second-longest-serving Lord Mayor of Melbourne, serving for seven and a half years. In 2006, he won the World Mayor award. On 1 October 2008, So announced that he would not seek re-election for a third term as Lord Mayor. He was succeeded by Robert Doyle.

So currently serves as chairman of the Global Business Council, an international forum established by the World Chinese Economic Forum in Malaysia aimed at facilitating trade between China, India, ASEAN and the Middle East. In December 2013, So was appointed by the Chinese government as a special advisor to the All-China Federation of Returned Overseas Chinese.

Background
So was born in British Hong Kong on 2 October 1946. When he was 17 years old, he moved to Melbourne and completed his secondary education at University High School. He then went on to tertiary studies, obtaining a Diploma of Education and Bachelor of Science degree from the University of Melbourne. After graduating, he taught physics at Fitzroy High School. So became a business operator in 1973, with interests across Australia, Hong Kong and Mainland China.

So's political career has included positions as director of Asia Society's AustralAsia Centre, commissioner of Victoria Ethics Affairs Commission, director of Melbourne Water, honorary member of the World Mayors Council on Climate Change, former executive member of the Committee For Melbourne, president of the Lord Mayor's Charitable Fund, chairman of the Asia Pacific Racing Carnival and chairman of the Victorian Chinese Welfare Centre.

So is actively involved in Australia's major sporting events. He was the number-one ticket holder for the Melbourne Demons football club and number-one ticket holder for the Melbourne Victory soccer club.

Politics

In 1991, So contested politics for the first time and was elected as one of the councillors of the City of Melbourne. He was re-elected in 1996 and 1999. In 1999, So came within one vote of being elected Lord Mayor, losing 4–5 to Peter Costigan.

In 2001, the Victorian Government dismissed the Lord Mayor, Deputy Lord Mayor and councillors for ongoing infighting that resulted in the council's inability to function. The government immediately reformed the system to give the Lord Mayor a stronger mandate. Under the new system, the Lord Mayor and Deputy Lord Mayor were to be directly elected by the citizens in a US presidential-style election, as opposed to being elected in-house among the councillors.

First term as Lord Mayor, 2001–2004
In the 2001 Lord Mayoral election, So polled 14.9% of the primary vote, second only to Peter Sheppard, who received 15.2%, but after preferences were distributed, So comfortably defeated Sheppard. So also defeated the then-Premier Steve Bracks's preferred candidate, Peter McMullin, and former federal minister and Australian Democrats founder Don Chipp.

So presided over a prosperous term in which Melbourne was voted World's Most Livable City on more than one occasion. Along with television presenter Livinia Nixon, he was the face of the "That's Melbourne" campaign to encourage tourism to the city. He campaigned against crime and was a member of the Police Minister's Crime Prevention Council. He also pushed for the federal government to build a national indigenous museum in Melbourne.

So was criticised for his communication skills, partly due to his heavily Cantonese-accented English. A restaurant with ties to So was also fined $75,000 for breaches of the Food Safety Act by his own council. In 2002, So was accused of putting his relationship with the Chinese government ahead of Melbourne by refusing to meet the Dalai Lama during his Australian visit. The council was also punished by the Victorian Civil and Administrative Tribunal for prohibiting Falun Gong from participating in the city's annual Moomba parade.

Second term as Lord Mayor, 2004–2008

2004 election
Though he had been a relatively popular mayor, So was widely expected to be defeated at the 2004 election. Despite this, he polled well on election day, achieving 42.2% of the primary vote (compared to his nearest rival who received 9.2%), and was re-elected. So's ticket for the Councillor positions was also successful, winning a historic majority in the Town Hall.

Commonwealth Games
During the 2006 Commonwealth Games, So was warmly welcomed by Melbourne as a figurehead of the city. This led to "John So, he's our bro'." T-shirts and "John So for PM'" shirts and stickers being manufactured and worn by some Melburnians as a testament to the city's tolerance and multiculturalism. At the closing ceremony of the 2006 Commonwealth Games, at every mention of So's name, there was a tremendous applause from the crowd, which became progressively louder with each occurrence.

Planning and development
So presided over a number of major developments throughout his second term. The most significant of these include the refurbishment of the city's key shopping complex, the Melbourne Central Shopping Centre; construction of the council's second building, Council House 2, the first Six Green Star-rated building in Australia; development, in partnership with the State Government, of the new Melbourne Convention & Exhibition Centre; and refurbishment of Melbourne's key shopping precinct Bourke Street Mall. During So's term, the council also regained from the State Government jurisdiction over Melbourne's new waterfront, Melbourne Docklands.

Controversies
In 2007, So was criticised for redundancies of staff at the Melbourne City Council after an efficiency review found that the council had a A$4.2 million budget discrepancy. So used his casting vote to defeat a "vote of no confidence" by opposition councillors over the incident. Following the vote, opposition councillors stepped up their attack and criticised So for not meeting with the Dalai Lama during the latter's 2007 visit, and claimed So had also tried to stop them from meeting the Dalai Lama.

World Mayor
So's popularity in office resulted in him being named World Mayor for 2006. He won the contest ahead of Amsterdam Mayor Job Cohen and Harrisburg Mayor Stephen R. Reed. World Mayor cited, amongst other things, the successful staging of the 2006 Commonwealth Games and So's popularity among the young population of Melbourne as a reason for his victory. In its verdict, the judging panel described So as "possibly the first city leader to enjoy 'cult status.

So told the media he was "delighted to be elected" and that "the honour belongs to the amazing people of this wonderful city and the hard-working team at the City of Melbourne".

Retirement as Lord Mayor
Speculation had been rife that So was preparing to stand for the Lord Mayoral election in November 2008. Rumours surfaced that former Victoria Premier Jeff Kennett might be able to challenge So effectively and Kennett confirmed that several Liberal Party members had approached him on this matter. In late September 2008, Kennett announced that he would not run for Lord Mayor.

On 1 October 2008, So officially announced that he would not seek re-election, stating "you can't work at 110 percent forever and that is what this job requires."

Honours and positions
In 2006, So was named World Mayor ahead of other candidates including Job Cohen, Ray Nagin, Michael Bloomberg and Shintaro Ishihara.

In 2006, So was among eleven recipients of the You Bring Charm to the World Award, presented at Peking University in Beijing. The award was jointly sponsored by Phoenix Television, Baidu, and Beijing Youth Daily and recognised the achievements of the "most influential Chinese in 2006".

In 2007, So received an honorary degree of Doctor of the University from Victoria University, in recognition of his services to local government.

In 2010, So was appointed as one of the six panel members of the Lee Kuan Yew World City Prize Council.

In 2011, So was a recipient of the World Chinese Economic Forum Lifetime Achievement Award.

In 2013, So was awarded the Sir Edward 'Weary' Dunlop Asia Medal.

On the Queen's Birthday in 2014, So was made an Officer of the Order of Australia (AO) for "distinguished service to local government and community relations, as an ambassador for cultural diversity, and to the promotion of Melbourne as a tourist and investment destination".

So is also a Member of the World Mayors Council on Climate Change.

Personal life
So has been married twice and has four children. His partner, Wendy Cheng, served as the Lady Mayoress of Melbourne and chaired the Lady Mayoress' Committee between 2001 and 2008.

So's youngest son, John So Jnr, an investment banker and businessman, ran unsuccessfully to be elected as Deputy Lord Mayor of Melbourne alongside Australia Sotheby's CEO, Gary Singer, in the 2012 Melbourne City Council Elections. Singer was previously Deputy Lord Mayor while John So Snr was in office.

So supports the Melbourne Demons in the Australian Football League.

References

External links 
John So – Official Website
John So No. 1 World Mayor
WCEF Global Business Council

Mayors and Lord Mayors of Melbourne
Businesspeople from Melbourne
Australian politicians of Chinese descent
Australian politicians of Hong Kong descent
University of Melbourne alumni
Hong Kong emigrants to Australia
1946 births
Living people
People educated at University High School, Melbourne
Politicians from Melbourne
Officers of the Order of Australia